Dori Hillestad Butler (born August 26, 1965) is an American author of more than 40 children's books, as well as magazine stories, plays and educational materials. Her first book, The Great Tooth Fairy Rip-Off, was published in 1997. She is known particularly for The Truth about Truman School, a 2008 young adult title focusing on the subject of cyber bullying, and for My Mom's Having a Baby (illustrated by Carol Thompson), which in 2011 appeared on the American Library Association's list of most commonly challenged books in the United States for its portrayal of conception and childbirth. Her 2010 mystery title, Buddy Files: Case of the Last Boy, won the 2011 Edgar Award for the best juvenile mystery published in 2010. Before becoming a children's author, Butler worked for three years as a page at a library.

She is married with two children. She lives in Kirkland, Washington.

References

External links

 Official website
 Interview with Bill Kenower, Editor-in-Chief of Authors Magazine on The Writing Life, November 30, 2018
 Interview with Cynthia Leitich Smith, December 2013

21st-century American writers
American children's writers
Edgar Award winners
Writers from Kirkland, Washington
1965 births
Living people
21st-century American women writers